Goniotropis is a genus of ground beetles in the family Carabidae. There are at least 40 described species in Goniotropis.

Species
These 40 species belong to the genus Goniotropis:

 Goniotropis angulicollis (Schaum, 1863)
 Goniotropis balli Deuve, 2005
 Goniotropis barclayi Deuve, 2005
 Goniotropis batesii (Chaudoir, 1868)
 Goniotropis boweni Deuve, 2009
 Goniotropis brasiliensis Gray, 1831
 Goniotropis brulei Deuve, 2011
 Goniotropis cartagoensis Deuve, 2004
 Goniotropis cayennensis Bänninger, 1949
 Goniotropis claritarsalis Deuve, 2005
 Goniotropis cotopaxiensis Deuve, 2005
 Goniotropis decellei Deuve, 2005
 Goniotropis ecuadorensis Deuve, 2005
 Goniotropis elongata (Chaudoir, 1854)
 Goniotropis escalonai Deuve, 2009
 Goniotropis guyanensis Deuve, 2005
 Goniotropis kuntzeni Bänninger, 1927
 Goniotropis morio (Klug, 1834)
 Goniotropis napoensis (Deuve, 2001)
 Goniotropis navattae Deuve, 2005
 Goniotropis nicaraguensis (Bates, 1891)
 Goniotropis olivieri (Chaudoir, 1868)
 Goniotropis omodon (Chaudoir, 1868)
 Goniotropis parca (LeConte, 1884)
 Goniotropis ratcliffei Deuve, 2009
 Goniotropis regina Deuve, 2009
 Goniotropis rogerii (Dejean, 1825)
 Goniotropis rondoniaensis Deuve, 2009
 Goniotropis roubaudi Deuve, 2004
 Goniotropis seagi Deuve, 2011
 Goniotropis seriatoporoides Deuve, 2004
 Goniotropis seriatoporus (Chaudoir, 1868)
 Goniotropis setifer (Bates, 1874)
 Goniotropis simplicicollis Deuve, 2007
 Goniotropis steineri Deuve, 2009
 Goniotropis tarsalis Bänninger, 1927
 Goniotropis taylorae Deuve, 2005
 Goniotropis telesfordi (Deuve, 2001)
 Goniotropis tiputinica Deuve, 2007
 Goniotropis toulgoeti Deuve, 2005

References

Further reading

 

Paussinae
Articles created by Qbugbot